Julien Decroix, better known as Soan, (born on 4 May 1981) is a French singer-songwriter who won in 2009 the seventh season of the French music competition Nouvelle Star.

Beginnings 
Soan left home at 17 over family discords and traveled a lot as a singer to earn his living but without notable success. He also sang at Paris Metro underground train stations.

Nouvelle Star
At 27, he took part in the Paris auditions of Nouvelle Star (French version of Idol) and was accepted to qualification rounds, without his audition being shown on the program. His rendition in the second round was also not shown. His first showing on the broadcast series was while doing a trio interpretation of BB Brunes's Dis-moi with two other candidates after which went to the lives rounds. On the show of 31 March 2009 on M6, judge Philippe Manœuvre announced his selection for the prime shows with 15 finalists left.

On 9 June 2009, he was declared the winner against tough competition from finalist and eventual runner-up Leïla Aissaoui as well as from third Camélia Jordana. He proved to be a phenomenon with his piercings and tattoos, pretty face, smoky eye makeup (l'oeil de biche), deep baritone voice and unique sense of fashion. Jean Paul Gaultier designed several of Soan's costumes and outfits.

Appearances during Nouvelle Star
Solo

In duos / trios

In groups
Group interpretations including Soan at the beginning of program

{| class="wikitable" style="text-align:center; width:80%;"
|-
! scope=col | Date
! scope=col | Title
! scope=col | Original artist 
|-
|21 April 2009||"I Want You Back"||The Jackson Five
|-
|28 April 2008||"Born to Be Alive"||Patrick Hernandez
|-
|5 May 2009||"Wake Me Up Before You Go-Go||George Michael
|-
|12 May 2009
|"Everybody Needs Somebody to Love" (The Blues Brothers version) ||Solomon Burke
|-
|19 May 2009
|"Waterloo"||ABBA
|-
|26 May 2009
|"Another One Bites the Dust"||Queen
|-
|2 June 2009
|"London Calling"||The Clash
|-
|9 June 2009||"YMCA"||Village People
|}

After Nouvelle Star
On 22 June 2009, he was featured as supporting act before a Jean Corti concert at Théâtre des Bouffes du Nord, in Paris, and between June and October 2009 took part in the Nouvelle Star 2009 Tour with 4 other finalists.

His debut album, Tant pis was released on 27 November 2009 on Jive Records. On 9 June 2010, he was invited to interpret one of his songs, "Séquelles", during the Nouvelle Star 2010 semi-finals. He also appeared at Laurent Ruquier's program On n'est pas couché''.

Discography

Albums

Singles 
2009: "Next time"
2010: "Emily"
2010: "Séquelles"

References

External links 
 
Soan YouTube site
Soan Le Lutin Sous l'Arbre Bleu website
Le Soanatorium Message Board

Nouvelle Star winners
1981 births
Living people
21st-century French singers
21st-century French male singers